Jim Calafiore is an American comic book penciller and inker, known for his work on Marvel Comics Exiles, and DC Comics' Aquaman. His other work includes Faction Paradox, and writing Marvel's Exiles and Millennium Visions.

Calafiore created the character Nocturne, who is the daughter of Nightcrawler and the Scarlet Witch from an alternate reality.

Partial bibliography

As penciler
Excalibur #119
Deadpool Vol. 3 #37, 42–45, 61, 64
Exiles #5, 6, 11, 16, 17, 21, 22, 31, 32, 34, 38–45, 49, 52, 53, 55–57, 60, 61, 66–68, 75–78, 81, 82, 84, 89
Iron Man v1 #325 (50/50)
New Excalibur #13-15
X-Men Unlimited #13, 19
Batgirl V2 #1-6
Gotham Underground #1-9
Camelot Eternal #1- (Caliber Press)

As writer
Exiles  #41, 42

External links

Jim Calafiore on the Unofficial Guide to Marvel Creators

American comics artists
Living people
Year of birth missing (living people)